Kayarlabath is a village in the Ariyalur taluk of Ariyalur district, Tamil Nadu, India.

Demographics 

 census, Kayarlabath (கயர்லாபாத்) had a total population of 4265 with 2209 males and 2056 females.

References 

Villages in Ariyalur district